Military logistics is the discipline of planning and carrying out the movement, supply, and maintenance of military forces. In its most comprehensive sense, it is those aspects or military operations that deal with:

 Design, development, acquisition, storage, distribution, maintenance, evacuation, and disposition of materiel.
 Transport of personnel.
 Acquisition or construction, maintenance, operation and disposition of facilities.
 Acquisition or furnishing of services.
 Medical and health service support.

Etymology and definition 
The word "logistics" is derived from the Greek adjective logistikos meaning "skilled in calculating", and the corresponding Latin word logisticus. In turn this comes from the Greek logos, which refers to the principles of thought and action. Another Latin root, log-, gave rise to logio, meaning to lodge or dwell, around 1380, and became the French verb , meaning "to lodge". The term  soon came to refer to his duties. It was in this sense that Antoine-Henri Jomini referred to the term in his Summary of the Art of War (1838). In the English translation, the word became "logistics".   

In 1888, Charles C. Rogers created a course on Naval Logistics at the Naval War College. In Farrow's Military Encyclopedia (1895), Edward S. Farrow, and instructor in tactics at West Point provided this definition:

The term became popularised during the Second World War. In Logistics in World War II: Final Report of the Army Service Forces, LeRoy Lutes gave the term a more expansive definition: 

Today, NATO uses this more restricted definition:

In the 1960s, the term Logistics began to be used in the business world, where it means physical distribution and supply chain management.

History

Antiquity 

Historically supplies for an army were first acquired by foraging or looting, especially in the case of food and fodder, although if traveling through a desolated region or staying in one place for too long resources could quickly be exhausted. A second method was for the army to bring along what was needed, whether by ships, pack animals, wagons or carried on the backs of the soldiers themselves. This allowed the army some measure of self-sufficiency, and up through to the 19th century most of the ammunition a soldier needed for an entire campaign could be carried on their person. However, this method led to an extensive baggage train which could slow down the army's advance and the development of faster-firing weapons soon outpaced an army's ability to supply itself. 

Starting with the Industrial Revolution new technological, technical and administrative advances led to a third method, that of maintaining supplies in a rear area and transporting them to the front.  This led to a "logistical revolution" which began in the 20th century and drastically improved the capabilities of modern armies while making them highly dependent on this new system.

5th to 15th century 

The De re militari, written by Publius Flavius Vegetius Renatus in the late 4th-century, is an authoritative text which Illuminates the logistics, strategies and tactics, as well as the training regimen for soldiers at the end of the Roman Empire, some of which was maintained and modified throughout the medieval period. It became used widely as a military guide during the medieval period and demonstrates the medieval inheritance and adaptation of the Roman military infrastructure.

One of the most significant changes in military organization after the fall of the Roman Empire in the 5th century was the shift from a centrally organized army to a combination of military forces made up of local troops. According to the De ordine palatii—composed in the late 9th century as a reflection of the organization of courts under Louis III of France and Carloman II—local troops often worked within the household during peace time and were provided food and drink from the high officials in the house. The magnates of the households drew upon their own resources for their men, and during Charlemagne's reign and the reign of the Ottonian dynasty in Germany, some heads of house built permanent storages and dwellings to house men or supplies.

While on campaign, soldiers through the medieval period (the 5th to 15th century in Europe) were responsible for supplying themselves, either through foraging, looting (more common during sieges), or purchases from markets along the campaign route. Even so, military commanders often provided their troops with food and supplies, but this would be provided in lieu of the soldiers' wages if they worked within the king's household, or soldiers would be expected to pay for it from their wages if they did not work in the king's household, either at cost or even with a profit.

Some early governments, such as the Carolingians in 8th century, required soldiers to supply their own food for three months, but would feed soldiers thereafter for free if the campaign or siege was ongoing. Later, during the German civil war in the early 1070s, Saxon soldiers were required to bring supplies enough for the entire campaign.

As for food transportation for soldiers and the beasts which accompanied the army on the campaigns, approximately 2,500 kilograms of food supplies were needed for the soldiers, roughly 9,000 kilograms of food for horses, and 19,000 kilograms (nearly 1/2 of which was grain) was needed for other beasts of burden (donkeys and oxen, for example) per day. Commanders could also bring along herds of cattle to provide their men with fresh meat while traveling. A herd of roughly 1,000 cattle could feed 14,000 or so men for roughly ten days.

Beasts of burden were used as vehicular transport for the food and supplies, either by carrying the supplies directly on their backs—the average medieval horse and mule could carry roughly 100 kilograms—or by pulling carts or wagons, depending on the weather conditions. Commanders also made use of water transport throughout the medieval period as it was often more efficient than ground transport. Prior to the crusading period, mid-scale sea vessels could carry several dozen tons of supplies. Cargo ships were also used, and were most commonly of the Nordic-type, the Utrecht-type, or the proto-cog crafts. Similar to the proto-cogs, river boats resembling simple log-boats were also used, as the larger crafts could carry up to 15 metric tons of supply and animal cargo. These ships made transporting supplies, and often soldiers, much easier and more reliable for the commander; but, the ability to use water transport was limited by geographic location, weather, and the availability of such ships. In the eastern Mediterranean, many vessels were smaller than those used in antiquity, often not exceeding 30-40 tonnes of cargo capacity. Supply by sea is not necessarily that much easier than supply by land, as factors like loading and unloading, stowage, and moving supplies to an army that may not be on the coast are all complicating factors.

Outside of food and fodder, commanders and soldiers also carried with them their arms and armor. In a letter from Charlemagne to Abbot Fulrad, the king states that horsemen must come prepared with their own arms and gear: including, "a shield, lance, sword, dagger, bow, and quivers with arrows". Likewise, according the Visigoth legal code (c.680), soldiers were required to come equipped for campaign with armor and shields. This practice was common throughout the pre-crusading period. Soldiers could often obtain the needed supplies from local craftsmen: smiths, carpenters, and leather workers often supplied the local militia troops with cooking utensils, bows and arrows, and horse shoes and saddles. Archaeologists have also found evidence of goods production in excavations of royal houses, suggesting that the Roman infrastructure of central arms and equipment factories was inherited, even if such factories were more decentralized. Further, all estates during Charlemagne's reign were required to have carpenters staffed to produce weapons and armor, according to the Capitulare de villis.

The construction of large-scale weapons systems, particularly those designed for siege warfare, was also an important part of military logistics. In the pre-crusading period, Vikings and Saxons would often use lever-action stone-throwing technology; but, the torsion-powered spear-throwing ballistae was also common, though it required much more technological expertise to build. The most difficult of the large-scale weapons systems to construct was the siege tower, which was meant to provide besieging soldiers with the ability to shoot at the level of their opponents in the tower or allow them to roll up to the tower itself and climb over the wall, breaching the fortress. The first recorded construction of a siege tower is in 984 during King Lothair IV's siege of Verdun. These siege engines were often constructed on site, rather than being constructed before the campaign and transported with the soldiers. In the 11th century, Emperor Otto III ordered siege engines to be built only once he had arrived at the fortress of Tivoli to begin his siege, and Emperor Henry II did the same upon arriving at Troia. It is generally assumed that the materials for the siege engines were transported along with the food, fodder, and arms and that specialized craftsmen from the military households travelled with the army to build the engines on site.

In 1294, the same year John II de Balliol of Scotland refused to support Edward I of England's planned invasion of France, Edward I implemented a system in Wales and Scotland where sheriffs would acquire foodstuffs, horses and carts from merchants with compulsory sales at prices fixed below typical market prices under the Crown's rights of prise and purveyance. These goods would then be transported to Royal Magazines in southern Scotland and along the Scottish border where English conscripts under his command could purchase them. This continued during the First War of Scottish Independence which began in 1296, though the system was unpopular and was ended with Edward I's death in 1307.

Starting under the rule of Edward II in 1307 and ending under the rule of Edward III in 1337, the English instead used a system where merchants would be asked to meet armies with supplies for the conscripts to purchase. This led to discontent as the merchants saw an opportunity to profiteer, forcing conscripts to pay well above normal market prices for food.

As Edward III went to war with France in the Hundred Years' War (starting in 1337), the English reintroduced the practise of foraging and raiding to meet their logistical needs. This practice lasted throughout the course of war, extending through the remainder of Edward III's reign into the reign of Henry VI.

16th century 
Starting in the late sixteenth century, armies in Europe greatly increased in size, upwards of 100,000 or more in some cases.  This increase in size came not just in the number of actual soldiers but also camp followers — anywhere from half to one and a half the size of the army itself — and the size of the baggage train — averaging one wagon for every fifteen men.  However, very little state support was provided to these massive armies, the vast majority of which consisted of mercenaries.  Beyond being paid for their service by the state (an act which bankrupted even the Spanish Empire on several occasions), these soldiers and their commanders were forced to provide everything for themselves.  If permanently assigned to a town or city with a working marketplace, or traveling along a well-established military route, supplies could be easily bought locally with intendants overseeing the exchanges.  In other cases an army traveling in friendly territory could expect to be followed by sutlers, whose supply stocks were small and subject to price gouging, or a commissioner could be sent ahead to a town to make arraignments, including quartering if necessary.

When operating in enemy territory an army was forced to plunder the local countryside for supplies, a historical tradition meant to allow war to be conducted at the enemy's expense.  However, with the increase in army sizes this reliance on plunder became a major problem, as many decisions regarding where an army could move or fight were made based not on strategic objectives but whether a given area was capable of supporting the soldiers' needs. Sieges in particular were affected by this, both for any army attempting to lay siege to a location or coming to its relief.  Unless a military commander was able to implement some sort of regular resupply, a fortress or town with a devastated countryside could be effectively immune to either operation.

Conversely, armies of this time had little need to maintain lines of communication while on the move, except insofar as it was necessary to recruit more soldiers, and thus could not be cut off from non-existent supply bases.  Although this theoretically granted armies freedom of movement, the need for plunder prevented any sort of sustained, purposeful advance.  Many armies were further restricted to following waterways due to the fact that what supplies they were forced to carry could be more easily transported by boat. Artillery in particular was reliant of this method of travel, since even a modest number of cannons of the period required hundreds of horses to pull overland and traveled at half the speed of the rest of the army.

17th century 

The first half of the seventeenth century saw the Thirty Years' War devastate large parts of Europe where waves of large invading armies repeatedly plundered the same locations for supplies.

By the mid-seventeenth century, the French under Secretary of State for War Michel Le Tellier began a series of military reforms to address some of the issues which had plagued armies previously. Besides ensuring that soldiers were more regularly paid and combating the corruption and inefficiencies of private contractors, Le Tellier devised formulas to calculate the exact amount of supplies necessary for a given campaign, created standardized contracts for dealing with commercial suppliers, and formed a permanent vehicle-park manned by army specialists whose job was to carry a few days' worth of supplies while accompanying the army during campaigns. With these arrangements there was a gradual increase in the use of magazines which could provide a more regular flow of supply via convoys. While the concepts of magazines and convoys was not new at this time, prior to the increase in army sizes there had rarely been cause to implement them.

Despite these changes, French armies still relied on plunder for a majority of their needs while on the move.  Magazines were created for specific campaigns and any surplus was immediately sold for both monetary gain and to lessen the tax burden.  The vehicles used to form convoys were contracted out from commercial interests or requisitioned from local stockpiles.  In addition, given warfare of this era's focus on fortified towns and an inability to establish front lines or exert a stabilizing control over large areas, these convoys often needed armies of their own to provide escort.  The primary benefits of these reforms was to supply an army during a siege.  This was borne out in the successful campaign of 1658 when the French army at no point was forced to end a siege on account of supplies, including the Siege of Dunkirk.

Le Tellier's son Louvois would continue his father's reforms after assuming his position.  The most important of these was to guarantee free daily rations for the soldiers, amounting to two pounds of bread or hardtack a day.  These rations were supplemented as circumstances allowed by a source of protein such as meat or beans; soldiers were still responsible for purchasing these items out-of-pocket but they were often available at below-market prices or even free at the expense of the state.  He also made permanent a system of magazines which were overseen by local governors to ensure they were fully stocked.  Some of these magazines were dedicated to providing frontier towns and fortresses several months' worth of supplies in the event of a siege, while the rest were dedicated to supporting French armies operating in the field.

With these reforms French armies enjoyed one of the best logistical systems in Europe, however there were still severe restrictions on its capabilities.  Only a fraction of an army's supply needs could be met by the magazines, requiring that it continue to use plunder.  In particular this was true for perishable goods or those too bulky to store and transport such as fodder.  The administration and transportation of supplies remained inadequate and subject to the deprivations of private contractors.  The primary aim of this system was still to keep an army supplied while conducting a siege, a task for which it succeeded, rather than increase its freedom of movement.

18th century 
The British were seriously handicapped in the American War of Independence by the need to ship all supplies across the Atlantic, since the Americans prevented most local purchases. The British found a solution after the war by creating the infrastructure and the experience needed to manage an empire. London reorganized the management of the supply of military food and transport that was completed in 1793–94 when the naval Victualling and Transport Boards undertook those responsibilities. It built upon experience learned from the supply of the very-long-distance Falklands garrison (1767–72) to systematize needed shipments to distant places such as Australia, Nova Scotia, and Sierra Leone. This new infrastructure allowed Britain to launch large expeditions to the Continent during the Revolutionary and Napoleonic Wars and to develop a global network of garrisons in the colonies.

19th century

Napoleon 

Before the Napoleonic wars, military supply was based on contracts with private companies, looting and requisition (legal taking of whatever the army needed, with minimal compensation). Napoleon made logistical operations a major part of French strategy. During the Ulm Campaign in 1805, the French army of 200,000 men had no need for time-consuming efforts to scour the countryside for supplies and live off the land, as it was well provided for by France's German allies. France's ally, the Electorate of Bavaria, turned the city of Augsburg into a gigantic supply center, allowing the Grande Armée, generously replenished with food, shoes and ammunition, to quickly invade Austria after the decisive French victory at Ulm. Napoleon left nothing to chance, requesting the Bavarians to prepare in advance a specified amount of food at certain cities such as Würzburg and Ulm, for which the French reimbursed them. When French demands proved excessive for the German principalities, the French army used a system of vouchers to requisition supplies and keep the rapid French advance going. The agreements with French allies permitted the French to obtain huge quantities of supplies within a few days' notice. Napoleon built up a major supply magazine at Passau, with barges transporting supplies down the Danube to Vienna to maintain the French army prior to the Battle of Austerlitz in combat readiness. In 1807, Napoleon created the first military train regiments—units entirely dedicated to the supply and the transport of equipment.

The French system fared poorly in the face of guerrilla warfare by Spanish "guerillas" that targeted their supply lines during the Peninsular War, and the British blockade of French-occupied ports on the Iberian Peninsula. The need to supply a besieged Barcelona made it impossible to control the province and ended French plans to incorporate Catalonia into Napoleon's Empire.

The first theoretical analysis of this was by the Swiss writer, Antoine-Henri Jomini, who studied the Napoleonic wars. In 1838, he devised a theory of war based on the trinity of strategy, tactics, and logistics.

Railways 

Railways and steamboats revolutionized logistics by the mid-19th century.

In the American Civil War (1861–65), both armies used railways extensively, for transport of personnel, supplies, horses and mules, and heavy field pieces. Both tried to disrupt the enemy's logistics by destroying trackage and bridges. Military railways were built specifically for supporting armies in the field.

During the Seven Weeks War of 1866, railways enabled the swift mobilization of the Prussian Army, but the problem of moving supplies from the end of rail lines to units at the front resulted in nearly 18,000 tons trapped on trains unable to be unloaded to ground transport. The Prussian use of railways during the Franco-Prussian War is often cited as a prime example of logistic modernizations, but the advantages of maneuver were often gained by abandoning supply lines that became hopelessly congested with rear-area traffic.

20th century

World War I 

With the expansion of military conscription and reserve systems in the decades leading up to the 20th century, the potential size of armies increased substantially, while the industrialization of firepower (bolt-action rifles, artillery, and machine guns) was starting to multiply the potential amount munitions each required. Military logistical systems, however, continued to rely on 19th century technology.

When World War I started, the capabilities of rail and horse-drawn supply were stretched to their limits. Where the stalemate of trench warfare took hold, special narrow gauge trench railways were built to extend the rail network to the front lines. The great size of the German Army proved too much for its railways to support except while immobile. Tactical successes like Operation Michael devolved into operational failures where logistics failed to keep up with the army's advance over shell-torn ground.

On the seas, the British blockade of Germany kept a stranglehold on raw materials, goods, and food needed to support Germany's war efforts, and is considered one of the key elements in the eventual Allied victory in the war. At the same time, Germany's unrestricted submarine warfare showed the vulnerability of shipping lanes despite Allied naval superiority.

World War II 

The mechanization of warfare, starting at the tail end of World War I, added increasing ammo, fuel, and maintenance needs of tanks and other combat vehicles to the burden on military logistics. The growing needs of more powerful and numerous military ships and aircraft increased this burden even further. On the other hand, mechanization also brought trucks to logistics; though they generally require better roads and bridges, trucks are much faster and far more efficient than fodder-bound horse-drawn transport. While many nations, including Germany, continued to rely on wagons to some extent, the US and UK readily switched to trucks wherever possible.

Military logistics played a significant role in many World War II operations, especially ones far from industrial centers, from the Finnish Lapland to the Burma Campaign, limiting the size and movement of any military forces. In the North African Campaign, with a lack of rail, few roads, and hot-dry climate, attacks and advances were timed as much by logistics as enemy actions. Poor logistics, in the form of Russia's vast distances and its state of road and rail networks, contributed to the fate of Germany's invasion of the USSR: despite many battlefield victories, the campaign lost momentum before the gates of Moscow.

Breaking the logistics supply line became a major target for airpower; a single fighter aircraft could attack dozens of supply vehicles at a time by strafing down a road, many miles behind the front line. Air superiority became critical for almost any major offensive in good weather. Allied air forces took out bridges and rail infrastructure throughout German-occupied northern France to help ensure the success of the Normandy landings. But after the breakout from Normandy, the destroyed transportation links limited the Allies' own logistics and stalled their advance. In response, the Red Ball Express was organized — a massive truck convoy system (including a loop of one-way roads) to supply the advance towards Germany. 

During the Battle of Stalingrad, Germany attempted to supply the surrounded 6th Army by air, called an airbridge, but the German forces lacked sufficient air transport to fulfil the mission. 

Allied airbridges were more successful; in the Burma Campaign, and in "The Hump" to resupply the Chinese war effort. (A few years after the war, the Berlin Air Lift was successful in supplying the whole non-Soviet half of the city.)

At sea, the Battle of the Atlantic began in the first days of the war and continued to the end. German surface raiders and U-boats targeted vital Allied cargo ship convoys supplying British, American, and Russian forces, and became more effective than in World War I. Technological improvements in both U-boats and anti-submarine warfare raced to out-do each other for years, with the Allies eventually keeping losses to U-boats in check.

Logistics was a major challenge for the American war effort, since wartime material had to be supplied across either the Atlantic or the even wider Pacific Ocean.  Germany undertook an aggressive U-boat campaign against American logistics on the Atlantic, but the Japanese neglected to attack shipping in the Pacific, using their submarines to fight alongside the surface Navy in large-scale battles. But Japanese submarines did take a toll, sinking more than a thousand merchant ships.

Long logistical distances dominated the Pacific War. For the attack on Pearl Harbor, the Japanese required numerous oiler ships to refuel the attacking fleet at sea on-route. Massive numbers of transports, including thousands of US Liberty ships, were used to sustain the Allied forces fighting back towards the Japanese homeland. As in the Atlantic, submarine warfare accounted for more losses than naval battles, with over 1,200 merchant ships sank.

Gulf War 
During Operation Desert Storm, US forces faced the daunting task of keeping over 500,000 American military personnel supplied in a geographically remote harsh environment with no pre-existing presence or basing arraignment.  This challenge was only further underscored by the logistical needs of the forces involved.  A typical US armored division was composed of 350 tanks, 200 Bradley fighting vehicles and 16,000 soldiers.  Together their daily supply requirement could amount to 5,000 tons of ammunition, 555,000 gallons of fuel, 300,000 gallons of water, and 80,000 meals.  To meet these needs the division was equipped with nearly a thousand trucks carrying cargo, fuel and ammunition, and 3,500 of the division's soldiers had logistical responsibilities.  Despite these resources though, the division could only sustain itself for three to five days before requiring resupply from an external source.  Likewise, a typical squadron of 24 fighter aircraft would require the equivalent of 20 C-141 Starlifters carrying supplies to support its initial deployment and operational capability.

Modern developments 

Logistics, occasionally referred to as "combat service support", must address highly uncertain conditions.  While perfect forecasts are rarely possible, forecast models can reduce uncertainty about what supplies or services will be needed, where and when they will be needed, or the best way to provide them.

Ultimately, responsible officials must make judgments on these matters, sometimes using intuition and scientifically weighing alternatives as the situation requires and permits. Their judgments must be based not only upon professional knowledge of the numerous aspects of logistics itself but also upon an understanding of the interplay of closely related military considerations such as strategy, tactics, intelligence, training, personnel, and finance.

However, case studies have shown that more quantitative, statistical analysis are often a significant improvement on human judgment.  One such recent example is the use of Applied Information Economics by the Office of Naval Research and the Marine Corps for forecasting bulk fuel requirements for the battlefield.

In major military conflicts, logistics matters are often crucial in deciding the overall outcome of wars.  For instance, tonnage war — the sinking of bulk cargo ships — was a crucial factor in World War II. The Allied anti-submarine campaign helped prevent the German Navy from sinking enough cargo ships in the Battle of the Atlantic to put Britain out of the war. And Britain's maintenance of a Mediterranean supply chain allowed a secondary front against the Nazis in North Africa. 

By contrast, the successes of the U.S. submarine campaign against Japanese shipping across Asian waters effectively crippled Japan's economy and its military production capabilities. In the Mediterranean, Axis forces were unable to consistently maintain a supply chain to their North African forces, suffering, on average, 25% fewer supplies being landed than required, and critical fuel shortages dictating strategic decisions.  

At the tactical scale, in the Battle of Ilomantsi, the Soviets had an overwhelming numerical superiority in guns and men, but managed to fire only 10,000 shells against the Finnish 36,000 shells. Soviet forces eventually were forced to abandon their heavy equipment and flee the battlefield, resulting in a Finnish victory. One reason for this was the Finnish harassment of Soviet supply lines.

More generally, protecting one's own supply lines and attacking those of an enemy is a fundamental military strategy; an example of this as a purely logistical campaign for the military means of implementing strategic policy was the Berlin Airlift.

Military logistics has pioneered a number of techniques that have since become widely deployed in the commercial world. Operations research grew out of WWII military logistics efforts.  Likewise, military logistics borrows from methods first introduced to the commercial world.

The Kargil Conflict in 1999 between India and Pakistan also referred to as Operation Vijay (Victory in Hindi) is one of the most recent examples of high altitude warfare in mountainous terrain that posed significant logistical problems for the combatants. The Stallion truck, which forms the bulk of the Indian Army's logistical vehicles, proved its reliability and serviceability with 95% operational availability during the operation.

21st century 
After 2016, as the counterinsurgency operations in CENTCOM were drawing down, the US Department of Defense began to prepare for large scale combat operations (LSCO) against near-peer adversaries. These adversaries are expected to be capable of integrated, coordinated, near-simultaneous operation in multiple domains (MDO) – air, space, land, sea, and cyber (that is, robotic, computer-driven, even automated competition/crisis/conflict). The preparation of a Joint Warfighting Concept is expected. Four sub-concepts are: § contested logistics, artillery indirect fire, command and control (C2), and information advantage. See  Defender Pacific 2021, and  Defender Europe 2021

In conditions approaching total war, top-down prosecution of a war may no longer be possible, as headquarters themselves become front-line units, which must remain on the move in order to survive conflict. "By 2035, sustainment nodes are to be survivable" and capable of rapidly moving materiel to the fight.

See also

Logistics-related 

 Aerial refueling
 Airlift
 Army engineering maintenance
 Expeditionary energy economics
 Expeditionary maneuver warfare
 Integrated logistics support
 Line of communication or communications (LOC)
 Logistician (see): Logistics Officer
 Maréchal-des-logis
 Materiel
 Military engineering
 Military supply chain management
 NATO Stock Number
 Performance-based logistics
 Praefectus castrorum
 Principles of sustainment
 Seabasing
 Sealift
 Train (military)
 Tooth-to-tail ratio
 Underway replenishment

Specific logistics operations 
 Battle of Pusan Perimeter logistics
 British logistics in the Falklands War
 British logistics in the Second Boer War

Notes

References

Further reading
 For Early and Late Medieval Military Logistics:
Carroll Gillmor, ‘Naval Logistics of the Cross-Channel Operation, 1066’ in Anglo-Norman Studies 7 (1985), 221–243. 
Richard Abels, ‘The Costs and Consequences of Anglo-Saxon Civil Defense, 878–1066’ in Landscapes of Defense in Early Medieval Europe , ed. John Baker, Stuart Brookes, and Andrew Reynolds (Turnhout, 2013), 195–222.
Bernard S. Bachrach, ‘Logistics in Pre-Crusade Europe’ in Feeding Mars: Logistics in Western Warfare from the Middle Ages to the Present , ed. John A. Lynn (Boulder, 1993), 57–78.
Bernard S. Bachrach, ‘Animals and Warfare in Early Medieval Europe’ in Set-timane di Studio del Centro Italiano di Studi sull’alto Medioevo 31 (Spoleto, 1985), 707–764.
David S. Bachrach, ‘Military Logistics in the Reign of Edward I of England, 1272–1307’ in War and Society 13 (2006), 421–438.
Michael Prestwich, ‘Victualling Estimates for English Garrisons in Scotland during the Early Fourteenth Century’ in The English Historical Review 82 (1967), 536–543.
Yuval Noah Harari, ‘Strategy and Supply in Fourteenth-Century Western European Invasion Campaigns’ in The Journal of Military History 64 (2000), 297–333.
Huston, James A. (1966). The Sinews of War: Army Logistics, 1775–1953. United States Army. 755 pages.
  

 Prebilič, Vladimir. "Theoretical aspects of military logistics". Defense and Security Analysis, June 2006, Vol. 22 Issue 2, pp. 159–77.

External links
 

 
Military science
Military